Tangari may refer to:
 Tangari, Iran
 Tangari, Papua New Guinea